Corallium occultum, formerly Corallium illiandinnum, is a species of coral in the family Coralliidae.

References

Animals described in 2015
Coralliidae